The New Forest Tour is an open-top bus service in the New Forest, running three circular routes around various towns, attractions and villages in the protected forest. It is run by morebus and Bluestar in partnership with Hampshire County Council, New Forest District Council and the New Forest National Park Authority.

As part of the tour, passengers can hop on and off wherever they would like. They can either catch the next tour, or switch between the different routes with the same ticket. With audio commentary on the buses, passengers can hear the stories of the people, places and animals of the New Forest. Passengers can also track buses via live departure times, or visually on a map, by visiting the morebus or bluestar websites, or in the bluestar bus and morebus app.

History

Initial Launch 
The tour was set up in 2004 by Solent Blue Line and City Sightseeing. The aim was to get traffic off the roads in and around the New Forest. When started, Solent Blue Line used a Bristol VR on a circular tour around the forest with a bike trailer.

In 2005, the tour continued in a similar form, except the route was reversed to today's anti-clockwise version.

In 2006 Solent Blue Line operated the tour with two nearly-new open-top buses from Wilts & Dorset. This was possible due to a £100,000 payment from Hampshire County Council. With an additional combined £30,000 funding every year for three years from the New Forest District Council and National Park Authority, the tour could run hourly instead of two hourly.

Under Go South Coast 

In 2007, the association with City Sightseeing was dropped, the 2006 review concluding that marketing should be developed with core funding partners, in a way "appropriate for the New Forest destination". The same buses as used in 2006 were used on the tour this year, which by now Solent Blue Line had acquired from Wilts & Dorset, both being part of Go South Coast. 

As part of the new marketing, the vehicles were painted in a new green livery with ponies on the side, essentially a green version of Southern Vectis' Island Breezers livery. The Tour's website was launched, and 60,000 leaflets were distributed to over 300 places. An official guide was also launched, given to passengers as they boarded the tour. The buses no longer towed trailers, carrying bicycles on the lower deck instead.

Prior to the 2008 service starting, Solent Blue Line renamed all of its services to run under the Bluestar name. The New Forest Tour remained a separate brand, but details now appear on the Bluestar website. The tour ran from 24 May to 31 August, and the connections to the tour were withdrawn. A professionally recorded commentary was added to the service.

Continued operations 
2008 was the final year of the three year funding commitment. In the 2008 review, Bluestar stated that revenue from ticket sales alone do not cover the cost of the current operation. To continue the tour in the same format into 2009 would require a subsidy.Therefore, a tender exercise is currently being worked on by Hampshire County Council to determine the level of subsidy required. This will allow for any operator to bid for the tender. A number of options are being considered, such as continuing as in 2008, only operating between Wednesdays and Sundays, only operating on the weekend and only using one bus.
The tour did return in 2009, between Saturday 20 June and Sunday 13 September 2009, running a similar service to 2008.

For the 2012 season new GPS commentary was added to the two tours (the red tour was introduced).
For 2013 the tours ran between 29 June and 15 September that year. A new blue tour was introduced because of the popularity of the other two tours the previous year. This tour originally ran hourly, but Wilts & Dorset later figured out that they couldn't run it on time on an hourly basis, so they changed the frequency to every hour and 15 mins, still using two buses. The other two routes remained hourly.

Routes 
In the network there are three routes, with them all going under individual colour scheme branding for each individual route.

Green Route 
The Green route runs approximately every hour and runs in a circular anticlockwise direction, with the starting point being at the town of Lyndhurst. The route covers the towns and villages of Brockenhurst, Lymington, Beaulieu, Exbury, Dibden Purlieu, Hythe and Applemore with the total journey time being estimated at 2 hours. From the town of Lyndhurst, tourists can transfer onto the Red route and from the towns of Brockenhurst and Lymington, tourists can transfer onto the Blue route.

Blue Route 
The Blue route runs approximately every hour and runs in a circular anticlockwise direction, with the starting point being at the town of Brockenhurst. The route covers the towns and villages of Burley, Bashley, New Milton, Barton-on-sea, Milford-on-sea and Lymington with the total journey time being estimated at 2 hours. From the town of Burley, tourists can transfer onto the Red route and from the towns of Brockenhurst and Lymington, tourists can transfer onto the Green route.

Red Route 
The Red route runs approximately every hour and runs in a circular clockwise direction, with the starting point being at the town of Lyndhurst. The route covers the other towns and villages of Burley, Ringwood, Fordingbridge, Cadnam and Ashurst with the total journey time being estimated at 2 hours. From the town of Lyndhurst, tourists can transfer onto the Green route and from the town of Burley, tourists can transfer onto the Blue route.

See also
List of bus operators of the United Kingdom

References

External Links 

 New Forest Tour website

Bus routes in England
Go South Coast companies
New Forest